Qarah Dash (also Romanized as Qarah Dāsh) is a village in Firuraq Rural District, in the Central District of Khoy County, West Azerbaijan Province, Iran. At the 2006 census, its population was 34, in 8 families.

References 

Populated places in Khoy County